is a side-scrolling action game produced by Flying Edge based on the line of toys of the same name developed by Tyco Toys, and released in North America, Japan and Europe.

Gameplay

In The Incredible Crash Dummies, the player plays as the two titular Crash Dummies, Spin and Slick, on their adventure to save their kidnapped mates Spare Tire, Darryl, and Bumper from the Junkman. It starts with Slick putting himself back together after a car wreck, while Spin checks the Crash Test Center, a research and development place for machines which is the location for the first stage's first section. He finds that Bumper was kidnapped in the Test Area by one of Junkman's helpers ("Junkbots") who is holding him hostage in the sewers; thus, the level's second section consists of both dummies saving Bumper and having a boss battle with the henchman in the process.

The player must finish levels and overcome obstacles, jumping off from towering houses, driving breakneck lawns over life-threatening ski slopes, a ride on rocket-propelled target missiles, piloting spaceships, and other tasks. Throughout the 27 stages, the player has to prevail against ten opponents.

Reception
The game received mixed-to-negative reviews upon release. In May 1993, Game Pro magazine gave the NES version three 3/5 scores for graphics, sound, and control, and 3.5/5 for the fun factor. In August 1993, the German magazine  gave the Master System version a 48% score for the fun factor. In August 1993, the British magazine Sega Force gave the Master System version a 84% score, stating that, the "gameplay is the same as on the Game Gear, things are easier to see, and it's still as tough as the handheld version, though, but criticising the problem of Crash Dummies becoming repetitive, after playing events twice, but overall a great game, you should consider adding to your collection". In October 1993, EGM's Mike Weigand gave the game a 4/10, noting the game's "never appealing idea", and that "this version proves the point", stating that, "this side-scrolling, survive the levels-type game is cute at times", but additionally disapproved "the poor control", and was dissatisfied that the game's "mandatory cheap hits by enemies ruin things". In January 1994, the Australian magazine Mega Zone gave the Genesis version a 58% score, noting that it's "[o]bviously intended for younger players, Crash Dummies lacks sophistication, an is not really relevant to serious gamesters." In February 1994, GamePro magazine gave the Genesis version three 4/5 scores for graphics, control, and fun factor, and a 3.5/5 rating for sound. In April 1994, the German magazine  gave both the Game Gear and the Master System version a rating of 79% on the fun factor, stating that this game is an absolute prime example of the fact that a module can spread a lot of fun even without elaborate technology.

Notes

References

Sources

External links

1992 video games
Sega video games
Master System games
Video games developed in Canada
Video games developed in the United Kingdom
Video games developed in the United States
Multiplayer and single-player video games
Video games scored by Alex Rudis
Video games scored by Allister Brimble
Video games scored by Matt Furniss
Video games scored by Tim Follin
Works based on advertisements